Silah may refer to:

Michael J. Silah, American admiral, director of the U.S. National Oceanic and Atmospheric Administration Commissioned Officer Corps
Sileh, a village in Iran